SN 2009gj was a supernova located approximately 60 million light years away from Earth. It was discovered on June 20, 2009, by New Zealand amateur astronomer and dairy farmer Stuart Parker.

See also

 List of supernovae
 History of supernova observation
 List of supernova remnants
 List of supernova candidates

References

External links 
 Light curves on the Open Supernova Catalog

Supernovae
Sculptor (constellation)
20090620